Allan Pineda Lindo (born November 28, 1974), known professionally as apl.de.ap, is a Filipino-American rapper, singer and record producer. He is a founding member of the hip hop group Black Eyed Peas.

Early life
Allan Pineda Lindo was born in Angeles City, Philippines. His African American father, an airman stationed at Clark Air Base, left the family shortly after his birth; his Filipino mother, Cristina Pineda, raised him and his six younger siblings as a single mother. As a child, Pineda would make an hour-long jeepney trip to and from his school and helped his family subsist by farming sweet potatoes, corn, sugar cane and rice. The Pearl S. Buck Foundation, an organization that finds healthier living environments for young, abandoned, or orphaned American children, matched him with a sponsor named Joe Ben Hudgens, a lawyer, through a dollar-a-day program.

He initially came to the United States at the age of eleven for treatment for nystagmus, an involuntary movement of the eyes. After a trip to Disneyland, Pineda expressed his interest in staying in the United States. It would take another three years for Hudgens to officially adopt him, but at fourteen he moved permanently to live with them.

In Los Angeles, Pineda attended John Marshall High School, where he met and befriended William Adams (stage name will.i.am), the nephew of Hudgens' roommate. Pineda's early musical influences were Stevie Wonder, The Eagles, The Beatles, A Tribe Called Quest, De La Soul, Leaders of the New School and the Filipino rock/folk group Asin. Pineda was introduced to hip hop by break dancing. "I would take the jeepney all the way to Angeles City, and that's how I got introduced to break dancing," he said. "I would see kids at the corner break-dancing and I'm like, 'I wanna do that.'" Pineda revealed to People magazine in 2011 that he is legally blind in both of his eyes, suffering from nystagmus, and has had this condition his entire career. His vision was corrected in 2012.

He has lost two of his siblings: his younger brother Arnel died by suicide (this is referenced in "The Apl Song" in the lines "I guess sometimes life's stresses get you down on your knees/Oh brother, wish I could have helped you out"). His youngest brother, Joven Pineda Deala, was murdered at the age of 22 in February 2009 in Porac, Pampanga.

Musical career

1988–2000: Formations and The Black Eyed Peas
The Black Eyed Peas date back to 1988, when eighth-graders will.i.am and apl.de.ap met and began rapping and performing together around Los Angeles. The pair signed to Ruthless Records (run by Eazy-E) in 1992, catching the attention of Eazy-E manager Jerry Heller's nephew. Along with another friend of theirs, Dante Santiago, they called their trio Atban Klann (ATBAN: A Tribe Beyond a Nation). Will 1X (aka will.i.am), apl.de.ap, Mookie Mook, DJ Motiv8 (aka Monroe Walker) and Dante Santiago formed Atban Klann. Their debut album, Grass Roots, was never released because Ruthless founder Eazy-E had died.

After Eazy-E died in 1995, Atban Klann reformed and changed their name to Black Eyed Pods, and then Black Eyed Peas. Dante Santiago was replaced with Taboo, and Kim Hill became a steady background singer. Unlike many hip hop acts, they chose to perform with a live band and adopted a musical and clothing style that differed wildly from the gangsta rap sounds of Los Angeles-based hip hop acts at the time. After being signed to Interscope Records and releasing their debut, Behind the Front (1998) the group (and their accompanying live band) earned critical acclaim. One of the singles from the album was "Joints & Jam", and was featured on the Bulworth soundtrack. Their second album was Bridging the Gap (2000), which included the single "Request + Line" featuring Macy Gray.

2000–2003: Elephunk
In November 2001, work began on a third Black Eyed Peas album, Elephunk. Development of the album began on November 2, 2001, and was released just under two years later in 2003. At the time of development, only will.i.am, apl.de.ap and Taboo were to feature on the album. During the production of "Shut Up" (the second single released from the album), they realized that a female vocal would work well with the song. Originally, Nicole Scherzinger (lead singer of the Pussycat Dolls) was approached to make a guest appearance on the record. She was forced to decline because she already was signed to a contract with Eden's Crush. Danté Santiago then introduced Fergie to Will who was impressed with her vocal talents. She immediately formed a bond with the band and became a permanent member of the Peas and her photo was printed onto the album cover. In the United States, Elephunk reached number 14 on the Billboard Top 200 and is their first album to chart in the top 15. It gained even more commercial success in the UK Album Charts where it reached number 3. It has sold over 1.6 million copies in the UK and 8.5 million copies worldwide. The singles "Where Is the Love?" and "Shut Up" reached number 1. "Hey Mama" has been used for several advertisements, including for Apple and iTunes. "Let's Get It Started" also received acclaim in the media, and a cover version of the song appears in the film Hot Tub Time Machine. After the success of Elephunk, the Peas were approached by EA games to feature some of their music on the 2004 game The Urbz. They remixed some of the tracks on Elephunk, and translated the lyrics into Simlish, and created new tracks for the game. They also feature in the game as playable characters.

The group released their breakthrough single, "Where Is the Love?", in November 2002 (featuring Justin Timberlake, although he did not appear in the video). On the strength of that single and follow-up singles like "Shut Up", Elephunk went on to sell 8.5 million copies worldwide.

2003–2006: Monkey Business
In November 2003, work began on a fourth Black Eyed Peas album, entitled Monkey Business, the second album with new band member Fergie. Upon the success of Monkey Business, which was released in 2005, the album was certified three times Platinum by the RIAA in the U.S. and has sold over 10 million copies worldwide. The Canadian Recording Industry Association (or CRIA) has certified Monkey Business 6× Platinum, with sales of over 600,000 copies. The Australian Recording Industry Association (or ARIA) has also certified Monkey Business 6× Platinum, denoting sales of over 420,000 copies. The album's tracks earned the group four 2006 Grammy Award nominations and they also won the Grammy for Best Rap Performance by a Duo or Group for "Don't Phunk with My Heart". According to IFPI, over 2 million copies have been sold in Europe. In the UK alone, it has sold over 1 million copies, although this is significantly lower than their sales of Elephunk, which stand at over 1.6 million copies and 10 million worldwide. The band announced they were going to take a break to focus on their own personal projects.

2009–2011: Continuation with The Black Eyed Peas with second hiatus

In early 2009, both Fergie and the group left A&M Records for unknown reasons. Both Fergie and the group are still with Interscope Records.

The group's fifth studio album, The E.N.D. ("The Energy Never Dies"), was released on June 9, 2009. The overall sound of the album has a more electro hop beat rather than the usual hip hop/R&B feeling of their previous albums. Following its release, will.i.am remarked that the album had been inspired by a trip to Australia, specifically the sound of The Presets' "My People". "The energy on the Presets' small little stage was crazy energy. That song My People – that shit is wild," will.i.am said, "That's the reason why this record sounds the way it does – my three months in Australia." In its first week, the album sold 304,000 copies and debuted at number 1 on the Billboard 200. In the United States, the album became the ninth album to top the one million mark in sales in 2009. The album spent 38 weeks within the top 10 of the Billboard 200. The E.N.D. was the 7th best-selling album of 2009 in the U.S. It also debuted at number one in Australia, number two in New Zealand and three in the United Kingdom. Three additional singles, "Imma Be", "Alive", and "Meet Me Halfway", were released through the iTunes Store in the three weeks running up to the album's release.

In 2009, the group became one of only artists to have simultaneously held the No. 1 and No. 2 spots on the Billboard Hot 100, with their singles "Boom Boom Pow" and "I Gotta Feeling", with the next single "Meet Me Halfway" achieving similar success, from the album The E.N.D.. These three singles topped the chart for 30 consecutive weeks in 2009. The album later produced a third Hot 100 number-one placement with "Imma Be", making the group one of few to ever place three number one singles on the chart from the same album before being followed with "Rock That Body" which managed to peak in the Top 10 of Hot 100. "I Gotta Feeling" became the first single to sell more than 1 million downloads in the United Kingdom.

The Black Eyed Peas were ranked 12th on the Billboards Decade-End Chart Artist of the Decade, and 7th in the Hot 100 Artists of the Decade. In November 2010, they released the album The Beginning. The first single of the album was "The Time (Dirty Bit)" and topped the charts in many countries. In February 2011, the group performed at the Super Bowl XLV halftime show. The album's second single was "Just Can't Get Enough" and was released in February 2011. The music video was filmed in Japan one week before the 2011 Tōhoku earthquake and tsunami. The third single "Don't Stop the Party" was released in May 2011. In July 2011 the group announced that they are taking a break and have denied breakup rumors.

2011–present: We Can Be Anything, Solo ventures

On October 11, apl.d.ap launched his new advocacy campaign with a song called "We Can Be Anything" for education, encouraging children in the Philippines and around the world to stay in school. He also teamed up with the Ninoy and Cory Aquino Foundation (NCAF), 57-75 Movement, and the Department of Education. Apl.d.ap and NCAF plan to build 10,000 classrooms in two years or less through the advocacy. His bandmates helped set the campaign grand launch at the Black Eyed Peas concert on October 25 at the SM Mall of Asia concert grounds.  On November 29, Apl.de.ap performed the campaign song with will.i.am at the Mnet Asian Music Awards held at the Singapore Indoor Stadium.

On May 19, 2012, apl.de.ap attended the We Can Be Anything Campaign Charity Gala Dinner at The Westbury Hotel in London. On October 13, he teamed up with Smart Communications to release a music video called "Jump In" featuring American Idol Season 11 runner-up Jessica Sanchez. In March 2013, apl.de.ap was confirmed to be one of the four coaches of the inaugural season of The Voice of the Philippines. On September 22, he premiered his new single "Balikbayan" on The Voice of the Philippines. He performed the song alongside the Top 8 contestants and Miss Universe 2010 fourth runner-up Venus Raj during the results night of the semi-finals. On September 27, he released the digital single, "Going Out". He also revealed that "Balikbayan" will be released on December. On January 31, 2015, apl.de.ap revealed his newest single and its accompanying music video, "Be", featuring Honey Cocaine and Jessica Reynoso.

He also appeared as a guest mentor for will.i.am on the third series of The Voice Australia. On June 12, 2014, he confirmed his return for the second season of The Voice of the Philippines.

Apl.de.ap collaborated with Filipino composer Ryan Cayabyab for his performance in the opening ceremony of the 2019 Southeast Asian Games in the Philippines. He and the rest of the Black Eyed Peas also performed in the closing ceremony.

Other ventures

Philanthropy
Apl.de.ap was honored in America by the prestigious This Time Foundation for his charity works.

On November 18, 2008, he founded the Apl Foundation to help various communities and children in the Philippines and throughout Asia. In 2011, after expressing his desire to help improve the education situation in the Philippines, his foundation formed a partnership with the Ninoy and Cory Aquino Foundation (NCAF) to create the "We Can Be Anything" advocacy campaign where Apl.de.ap and NCAF plan to build 10,000 classrooms in two years or less through the advocacy.

The Voice of the Philippines
During an interview with The Huffington Post in 2012, he stated that he had plans to launch his own talent show in the Philippines. "I've been working myself up to do it because I'm not used to being on TV everyday... I've been offered a show for next year," he revealed. This eventually fueled rumors that he would join the panel of the show, after ABS-CBN acquired the rights to launch a local version of The Voice franchise later that year.

On March 1, 2013, ABS-CBN confirmed that they were in the final stages of negotiating with his management to become its fourth and last official coach of the show. On March 7, it was announced through ABS-CBN's entertainment website, Push, that apl would sit as the fourth coach. On March 20, the network's official website stated that he was scheduled to do the initial promotional plug with TFC London and was scheduled to arrive in Manila by April to meet and work with the three other coaches and the rest of the show's team. His promotional television plug was aired on March 27 right after TV Patrol. During his introduction as the fourth coach, he was dubbed as "The voice that ruled the worldwide music chart."

In an interview conducted by ABS-CBN News, apl admitted that it was will.i.am who encouraged him to accept the coaching stint in The Voice of the Philippines. Will.i.am is also a coach on The Voice UK. Apl also told the press that he would be truthful in coaching his artists, as well give them constructive criticisms. He also wants to share his life experiences, what he has been through the music industry, and how hard it is to fulfill and reach it.

Apl was also a coach on the second season of The Voice Teens.

BMBX Entertainment
In 2014, apl opened his independent record label, BMBX Entertainment, whose name refers to 'boombox'. The label aims to sign South East Asian artists and give them a Western-style production by collaborating with musicians in Los Angeles. It sources its talent from the Philippines, Singapore and Malaysia. Its current roster includes Slapshock, Kevin Lester and The Voice Philippines season 1 semi-finalist Jessica Reynoso.

Personal life
During an interview with ABC News, apl.de.ap said that he was born with a condition called nystagmus, which is characterized by an involuntary movement of the eyes that limits vision. The interview showed him undergoing an eye surgery by Beverly Hills eye surgeon Brian Boxer Wachler to implant artificial lenses into his eyes to correct his nearsightedness and nystagmus.

Pineda is a native speaker of two Philippine languages: Tagalog and Kapampangan.

Discography

Mixtapes
2011: It's Me Applebees
2021: It's Me Applebees II
2022: It's Me Applebees III: More Applebees

Singles
2012: "We Can Be Anything"
2012: "Fly"
2013: "Going Out"
2015: "Be" featuring Honey Cocaine & Jessica Reynoso

As featured artist
2010: "Spaceship" (with Benny Benassi, Kelis, and Jean-Baptiste)
2012: "El Presidente" (with Slapshock) 
2013: "Gettin' Dumb" (with will.i.am and 2NE1)

Guest appearances
2009: "On the Dancefloor" (David Guetta featuring will.i.am and apl.de.ap)

Awards
 2008 – Special Citation – Myx Music Awards
 2010 – Best Hip-Hop/Rap Performance: Take Me to the Philippines – Filipino-American Vocal Arts Society Online Music Awards
 2012 GMMSF Box-Office Entertainment Awards - Global Achievement by a Filipino Artist

References

External links
 Official apl.de.ap website
 The Black Eyed Peas' official website
 
 apl.de.ap interview with JiZO June 2009

1974 births
Living people
20th-century American rappers
21st-century American rappers
African-American male rappers
American male rappers
American adoptees
American hip hop singers
American rappers of Filipino descent
American people of Kapampangan descent
Black Eyed Peas members
Filipino emigrants to the United States
Filipino people of African-American descent
Filipino rappers
Grammy Award winners
Naturalized citizens of the United States
People from Angeles City
Recipients of the Presidential Medal of Merit (Philippines)
Singers from Pampanga
Rappers from Los Angeles
ABS-CBN personalities
Asian American music